is the name of three Buddhist temples of the Nichiren sect in Japan. It could refer to one of the following:

Jōzai-ji (Toshima) in Toshima, Tokyo
Jōzai-ji (Ebina) in Ebina, Kanagawa Prefecture
Jōzai-ji (Gifu) in Gifu, Gifu Prefecture (the Saitō clan's temple)

Nichiren temples